Haustorius canadensis is a species of amphipod in the family Haustoriidae.

References

Gammaridea
Articles created by Qbugbot
Crustaceans described in 1962